Numerous video games featuring the popular Marvel Comics superhero Spider-Man have been officially released. To date, Spider-Man has appeared on over fifteen gaming platforms, including apps on mobile phones.

Overview

1980s
The Marvel Comics superhero Spider-Man was created by Stan Lee and Steve Ditko and first appeared in Amazing Fantasy #15 (August 1962).

By the late 1970s, Spider-Man had become a successful franchise. At this time the fictional character had already featured in the animated series Spider-Man, a segment on the children's television series The Electric Company (called Spidey Super Stories), and the live action prime time series The Amazing Spider-Man. As a result of the success, Marvel Comics licensed the character into a stream of electronic games.

Spider-Man was quickly growing in popularity because of his simplistic Spider-Style costume, he was also the favorite character of Stan Lee and soon he was one of the most loved Marvel fictional characters.

Atari 2600 (1982)

In 1982, Parker Brothers published a game for the Atari 2600 (and its clone system, the Sears Video Arcade) titled Spider-Man. The action game involves climbing a skyscraper, capturing criminals and defusing bombs set by the Green Goblin. It supports two players.

The game is similar to the 1980 arcade video game Crazy Climber. It is a variation on its gameplay format, with added web shooting and swinging abilities.

Questprobe (1984)
In 1984, Scott Adams released the second in the Questprobe series of text adventure games. The second in the series was titled Questprobe: Spider-Man, and involved Spider-Man hunting for a series of gems at the behest of a mysterious character named the "Chief Examiner". The game was ported to the Commodore 64, Commodore 16, Atari 8-bit family, ZX Spectrum, PC, Amstrad CPC, and the Apple II. This was a first-person-perspective graphical adventure game, with commands entered textually.

The Amazing Spider-Man and Captain America in Dr. Doom's Revenge! & The Revenge of Shinobi (1989)

In 1989, Spider-Man and Captain America in Doctor Doom's Revenge was released for PC DOS, Amiga, Atari ST, Amstrad CPC, ZX Spectrum and Commodore 64. The game was written by Paragon Software Corporation, and published by Medallist (a subsidiary of MicroProse). The story of the game is told in a series of comic panels, with the game play similar to that of Street Fighter: The player, as either Captain America or Spider-Man, battles villains one-on-one until facing Doctor Doom.

In December 1989, The Revenge of Shinobi was released on the Mega Drive/Genesis. The game's boss battles feature comic book characters including Spider-Man and Batman, as well as famous movie characters, including Terminator and Godzilla, and even Rambo as normal-stage enemy. Initially, Spider-Man was included without consent from Marvel, but another version was released, this time with the copyright message shown in the beginning of the game, giving credit to Marvel, and editing the looks of Batman, Rambo and Godzilla, so avoiding a possible lawsuit; a Sega CD version was released, being derived from the altered version.

1990s
In the 1990s, comics enjoyed a boom, and the early 1990s saw a myriad of video games based on high-profile comic story lines and the 1994 Spider-Man: The Animated Series.

Home computers

The Amazing Spider-Man was the first game of the decade released, a puzzle oriented action game developed by Oxford Digital Enterprises and released in 1990 for the Amiga and ported to MS-DOS, Commodore 64, and Atari ST. The title was published by Paragon Software Corporation and features over 250 screens.

Game Boy
The Amazing Spider-Man, developed by Rareware and released in 1990 was the first in a trilogy for the newly introduced Game Boy. The game was published by LJN (a subsidiary of Acclaim), the first of a series of games published based on licensed Marvel characters. The game play involves running across New York chasing supervillains to locate Mary Jane Watson.

The Amazing Spider-Man 2 was developed by Bits Studios and released in 1992. The game is a side-scrolling beat-'em up. Spider-Man attempts to clear his name after he is accused of a crime committed by the Hobgoblin.

Spider-Man 3: Invasion of the Spider-Slayers, the third in the series, was released in 1993 by Bits Studios.

The Punisher: The Ultimate Payback! by Australian company Beam Software was released in 1991 for the Game Boy. The game is much like Operation Wolf, with the Punisher shooting villains while protecting the innocent. Spider-Man appears between the action to offer advice on how to beat upcoming levels and swings in to rescue hostages once their captors have been shot.

Games for the Sega family of consoles
The Amazing Spider-Man vs. The Kingpin, developed and published by Sega and released in 1990, was the first game featuring Spider-Man on Sega consoles. The game premiered on the Master System and Genesis in 1991, followed by the Game Gear in 1992, and to the Sega CD in 1993. Fundamentally, the game is the same on each platform with each iteration including new levels, enhanced graphics and a few incremental improvements to the game play. The story involves Spider-Man trying to collect six keys from six villains to defuse a bomb in New York planted by the Kingpin. Spider-Man has a finite supply of web fluid and the only way to replenish is to take photos, most profitably of the supervillains, to sell to the Daily Bugle.

Spider-Man: The Video Game was released in 1991 for coin-operated arcades. Developed by Sega on Sega System 32 hardware, the game is a four-player, platform beat-'em-up similar to Data East's Captain America and the Avengers released the same year. The player plays as Spider-Man, Black Cat, Namor the Sub-Mariner, or Hawkeye, with the game divided into four acts.

Nintendo Entertainment System
Spider-Man: Return of the Sinister Six developed by B.I.T.S. and released in 1992 for the Nintendo Entertainment System was the first game featuring Spider-Man on the NES. It was an action platform game that involved Spider-Man swinging across various levels to defeat each one of the Sinister Six; Electro, Sandman, Mysterio, Hobgoblin, Vulture and Doctor Octopus. Ports to the Master System and Game Gear followed in 1993.

Genesis and Super NES
Spider-Man/X-Men: Arcade's Revenge, the first Spider-Man cross platform game, was released on the Super Nintendo Entertainment System and Sega Genesis. It was first developed for the Super NES in 1992 by Software Creations (who went on to produce several games for Marvel) and published by LJN. The game was later ported to the Genesis in 1993. The game involves rescuing four of the mutant superhero X-Men (Wolverine, Cyclops, Storm, Gambit) from an assassin named Arcade. The player must navigate Spider-Man in search of the captured heroes (who join Spider-Man when found), fighting a variety of super villains. Software Creations later adapted the game to the Game Boy in 1993 and to Game Gear in 1994.

Spider-Man and Venom: Maximum Carnage, released on Super NES and Genesis in 1994, was the first one of two major Marvel comic book storyline adaptations by Software Creations. Venom/Spider-Man: Separation Anxiety released in 1995 for Super NES, Genesis and PC was the sequel. Both games are side scrolling beat-'em up action games where the player controls either Spider-Man or Venom, fighting various villains from the comic book plotlines.

Spider-Man from 1995, was developed by Western Technologies and published by Acclaim on the Genesis, and by LJN on the Super NES. It marked the beginning of a range of software incorporating elements from the Spider-Man cartoon. The game is a side scrolling action platformer. The Super NES game features six levels, five bosses, and fourteen sub-bosses. The Genesis game features five levels, five bosses, and thirteen sub-bosses. The game also features the Fantastic Four.

Super Famicom
The Amazing Spider-Man: Lethal Foes was released in 1995 for the Super Famicom exclusively in Japan, very loosely based on the mini-series The Lethal Foes of Spider-Man.

Tiger's LCD games
Over the years Tiger Electronics released several handheld LCD Spider-Man games.

Spider-Man Cartoon Maker
Spider-Man Cartoon Maker, released in 1995 by Knowledge Adventure, is a software package that allowed the user to create films by utilizing an archive of backdrops, animations and props from the Spider-Man animated series. The game featured the voice of Christopher Daniel Barnes, who played Spider-Man in the series.

Marvel CD-ROM Comics featuring Spider-Man
That same year Marvel attempted to release classic comic books onto CD-ROM. Only four were ever produced, based on Spider-Man, the X-Men, Iron Man and the Fantastic Four. The Spider-Man one titled, Marvel CD-ROM Comics featuring Spider-Man included animation from the series, trivia games, and four complete issues of the comic narrated by Christopher Daniel Barnes.

Capcom's arcade fighting games
Marvel Super Heroes for the CPS II arcade hardware was a result of the success of Capcom's fighting game X-Men: Children of the Atom. It was developed by Capcom, released in 1995, ported to Sega Saturn, PlayStation and MS-DOS and features Spider-Man as a playable character.

Marvel Super Heroes: War of the Gems, an unrelated action game, was released for the SNES in 1996. The game involves utilizing each of the Marvel superheroes through each of their levels to collect one of the Gems needed to complete the game. The SNES features Iron Man, Captain America, Hulk, Wolverine, and Spider-Man.

After Children of the Atom and Marvel Super Heroes, a partnership between Marvel and Capcom began, combining the two universes into the Marvel vs. Capcom fighting game series. Spider-Man would appear as a playable character in several titles:
Marvel Super Heroes (1995)
Marvel Super Heroes vs. Street Fighter (1997)
Marvel vs. Capcom: Clash of Super Heroes (1998)
Marvel vs. Capcom 2: New Age of Heroes (2000)
Venom also appears as a playable character in the latter two games.
Spider-Man later returns in Marvel vs. Capcom 3: Fate of Two Worlds.

This Spider-Man was seemingly killed by Morlun with a single punch during the events of Spider-Verse.

The Amazing Spider-Man: Web of Fire
Spider-Man: Web of Fire was developed by Harutyun Zatikian in 1996 and published by Sega for the Sega 32X, as one of the final titles for the add-on. The game is a platform action game similar to the previous Sega title, Spider-Man vs. The Kingpin. This time Spider-Man teams up with Daredevil to prevent the invading forces of HYDRA from taking over New York City. The game is broken into six levels with bosses such as the Eel, Tangle, and the Super-Adaptoid.

Spider-Man: The Sinister Six
Spider-Man: The Sinister Six, developed by Brooklyn Multimedia was an adventure game for the PC. The game was released in 1996 and published by Byron Preiss Multimedia. The game allowed the user to choose the path the narrative would take, interact with characters as Peter Parker, collect items, and confront various puzzles, boss battles, and mini games.

Marvel Creativity Center
Marvel Creativity Center, released in 1997 for both PC and Apple Mac by Cloud 9 Interactive, teaches the user how to create comics, the 'Marvel Way' with Stan Lee and Spider-Man acting as guides. The "story" involves Marvel studios being infiltrated by a mystery villain who has broken contact with all the regular Marvel artists and writers, leaving it up to the user to plot, script, illustrate and letter a comic.

2000s
Throughout the late 1990s, Marvel Comics suffered an industry slump with Marvel filing for bankruptcy, which explains the lack of Spider-Man games towards the end of the late 1990s. However, by 2000, Marvel was profitable again and was gearing up to drop the Comics Code Authority and established its own rating system. They began seriously licensing its characters for major feature film adaptations (with the commercially successful X-Men film premiering on July 14, 2000). By the late 2000s, new Spider-Man games were in the works, being published by Activision, until January 2, 2014, when the license expired.

Early PlayStation and Game Boy Color games
As a symbolic gesture of Marvel's return the development of two separate Spider-Man titles for PlayStation and Game Boy Color were announced. Neversoft's PlayStation iteration was highly successful. Enhanced versions were ported by other developers to the Nintendo 64 in 2000 and PC CD-ROM and the Dreamcast in 2001. A sequel, Spider-Man 2: Enter Electro was released in 2001 for the PlayStation and developed by Vicarious Visions. In those two games, Spider-Man was voiced by Rino Romano.

A sequel to the Game Boy Color version, Spider-Man 2: The Sinister Six (not related to the NES Spider-Man: Return of the Sinister Six) was also released in 2001 and was developed by Torus Games.

The PlayStation Spider-Man utilized the same engine as Tony Hawk's Pro Skater 2 (released September 2000) which was also developed by Neversoft. As an easter egg, developer Neversoft Entertainment included the ability to play as Spider-Man if the player achieved a high level of success in 'career mode'.

A standalone sequel to the first two games, Spider-Man: Mysterio's Menace, was released once again in 2001 and also developed by Vicarious Visions.

In September 2001, Spider-Man made a small cameo appearance as one of the fighters in the fighting game by Paradox Development, X-Men: Mutant Academy 2 for PlayStation.

In X2: Wolverine's Revenge, there was a deleted scene where Wolverine has his encounter with Spider-Man (again voiced by an uncredited Rino Romano) in a ruined town. When Wolverine states that Spider-Man is off his home turf, Spider-Man states that he heard about the big bust-out at the Void and rode on the Charter Bus to the ruined town with the other superheroes that can't fly or teleport. When Spider-Man asks Wolverine if he needs help fighting Magneto, Wolverine tells him to deal with the chaos in town until Damage Control arrives.

Film adaptation series (2002 - 2007)

Spider-Man: The Movie, Spider-Man 2 and Spider-Man 3
As the live action Spider-Man movie was released in 2002, a game developed by Treyarch titled, Spider-Man: The Movie was developed for PC, PlayStation 2, Xbox and Nintendo GameCube with a separate title developed by Digital Eclipse Software for Game Boy Advance. The game play was similar to that of Neversoft's previous Spider-Man game, except it featured for the first time aerial combat, and to an extent allowed the user to 'web sling' over New York openly, although not being able to land on the ground below. The game sported the voice of the actors from the film, including Tobey Maguire, Willem Dafoe, and cult icon Bruce Campbell. Josh Keaton voices Harry Osborn, who is playable in his own bonus storyline, where he dons his father's Green Goblin gear after his death and investigates a conspiracy involving Oscorp.

After the critical success of both the first Spider-Man film and the video game releases, Marvel ordered a wider selection of titles to coincide with the release of Spider-Man 2. The flagship titles being Treyarch's Spider-Man 2: The Game for PlayStation 2, Xbox and Nintendo GameCube, which extended the open environment concept started by their previous title. Unlike the previous generation of games based on the film, Treyarch's game was not released for the PC, and in its stead was an original game developed by Fizz Factor. The reasons for this remain unclear, and Fizz Factors game did not include the open environment game play as seen in Treyarch's game and appeared to be targeted towards a younger audience, despite the game being marketed the same as the console release. Later, in 2005, another version of Spider-Man 2, this time for Sony's new handheld, the PlayStation Portable; which debuted in the first quarter of the year along with the system, was released. The PSP version of Spider-Man 2 was the first action game for the PSP. This version includes an exclusive character, Vulture. The PlayStation, Xbox and GameCube version got high critical acclaim and is often the basis for comparison for other Spider-Man video games.

In 2007 Spider-Man 3 was released for PlayStation 3, Xbox 360, Wii, PC, PlayStation 2, PSP and Nintendo DS, based on the film of the same name. It's very similar to its predecessor in terms of gameplay, and loosely follows the plot of the film, while featuring new secondary storylines with characters not seen in the film. The game introduces the symbiote black suit, which enhances Spider-Man's powers, and the next-gen version also features the New Goblin as a playable character in the final mission of the game; he was later added as DLC for the PlayStation 3 and Xbox 360 versions. The next-gen version of the game was developed by Treyarch, the other console version was developed by Vicarious Visions, and the PC version by Beenox. Xbox and Nintendo GameCube versions of the game were also planned, but later cancelled due to low sales for Xbox and limited resources for GameCube. In 2007, two Spider-Man 3 games were released for mobile devices, developed by Javaground USA and produced by Sony Online Entertainment. Spider-Man 3 Action was released early in the year, followed by Spider-Man 3 Puzzle a few months later.

Spider-Man: Friend or Foe
Spider-Man: Friend or Foe was released on October 2, 2007, for Xbox 360, Wii, PlayStation 2, PC, PSP and Nintendo DS where James Arnold Taylor reprised his role of Spider-Man. The game borrows inspiration from the Spider-Man film trilogy in terms of character designs, and also features characters from outside the films. It is a linear beat 'em up game, where Spider-Man teams up with various villains and heroes to stop a symbiote invasion orchestrated by Mysterio. The game can be played by two players, with one controlling Spider-Man and the other one of his allies.

Cast and characters

Sony Pictures Mobile games
Sony Pictures Mobile released a Spider-Man game for wireless phone in 2003. The game was such a success that a number of titles were planned to be released alongside the Spider-Man 2 film. Some titles were delayed and are slowly being released. Current titles include; Spider-Man vs. Doc Ock (May 2004) (a multi-level action-adventure game where Spider-Man battles Doc Ock), Spider-Man 2 Pinball (May 2004) (virtual pinball game, themed with Spider-Man & Doc Ock characters), Spider-Man 2 3D: NY Subway (April 2005) (the player acts as Spider-Man as he leaps, swings and soars through the city, defeating thugs and ultimately facing off with Doc Ock. The 3D games feature superior graphics and sound and showcase the advanced capabilities of new mobile handsets) and Spider-Man 2 Text Messaging Games (players must show their knowledge of Spider-Man trivia and navigate through a mission-based text game). Other hand handheld versions developed appeared on the Nintendo DS and Game Boy Advance by Vicarious Visions and N-Gage by Backbone Entertainment.

JakksTVGames
In November 2004, in time for Christmas JakksTVGames released an all inclusive controller that includes an ATV input jack, to operate as a console plugged straight into a TV. It was titled Spider-Man Controller with 5 TV Games, and as the name suggests includes five original video games each with a different goal; Streets of the City, Spider Training, Venom's Vindication, Escape from the Sewers, and Vulture's Venture.

Micro Games of America
Additionally, Micro Games of America towards the end of 2004 released a portable LCD game, titled Spider-Man 2. Sony Pictures has also released, their own LCD game, titled Spider-Man 2 Hand Held Game and a virtual reality head set portable game titled, Spider-Man 2 VR 3D.

Spider-Man & Friends
As 2005 began, Activision released Spider-Man & Friends for PC. It was developed by their internal company, Activision Value and targeted towards young children. It featured action game based gameplay with various puzzles used as a learning tool. In March, Activision Value released their second title based on the Spider-Man franchise, Spider-Man Print Studio. The software allows the user to print various calendars, posters, bookmarks, flyers, door hangers, and masks from a library of pre-existing Spider-Man themed art, with Spider-Man as a guide to show the user the software.  This game also appeared on the Vtech, V.Smile educational console.

Ultimate Spider-Man
The Ultimate Marvel iteration of Spider-Man is featured in Ultimate Spider-Man, voiced by Sean Marquette. Based on the Ultimate Spider-Man comics, it was released on September 22, 2005, for the Nintendo GameCube, Xbox, PlayStation 2, Nintendo DS, PC, Mobile Phones, and Game Boy Advance. Both Spider-Man and Venom are available as playable characters, each with their own storylines that cross over on multiple occasions. The game also introduces the new Comic Inking Animation technology, cel shading that makes the entire game appear as if it were a living comic-book. The writing and art design for Ultimate Spider-Man were done by Brian Michael Bendis and Mark Bagley, respectively, who both have worked on the comic book series of the same name since it was launched. The game's storyline also supposedly fits into the Ultimate Spider-Man comics, with issues 86 - 88 depicting the aftermath of the game's events . However, the issues did not entirely fit in with the game's story, and in fact had several continuity errors with the game (E.g. Silver Sable not knowing who Spider-Man is, despite encountering him multiple times in the game and even learning his secret identity).

Marvel Nemesis: Rise of the Imperfects
Also in September 2005, Marvel Nemesis: Rise of the Imperfects was released, which includes both Spider-Man (voiced by Alistair Abell) and Venom as playable characters. The game was released for Nintendo GameCube, PlayStation 2, Xbox, PlayStation Portable and Nintendo DS.

A spiritual sequel to Marvel Nemesis was scheduled for release. A preview of the game was released containing a battle between Spider-Man and Doctor Doom, but due to the end of the partnership between EA and Marvel the game was cancelled.

Marvel: Ultimate Alliance
Spider-Man is a featured playable character in Marvel: Ultimate Alliance, voiced by Quinton Flynn. The Scarlet Spider is an alternate costume for Spider-Man outside of his Classic, Symbiote, and Stark Armor costumes. Outside of playable character status, he is seen in the cutscenes with Captain America, Thor, and Wolverine. Spider-Man has special dialogue with various characters ranging from Dark Spider-Man and Dark Thor, Black Widow, Henry Pym, Lizard, Lockjaw, Mysterio, Rhino, Scorpion, and Shocker. A simulation disk has Spider-Man defending Dum Dum Dugan from Scorpion while on the S.H.I.E.L.D. Omega Base. Spider-Man shows mock envy to his allies during mission briefings, making comments on S.H.I.E.L.D's advanced Hellicarrier and Omega base, Tony Stark's wealth and the X-Men's relationship with the Shi'ar Empire.

Spider-Man: Battle for New York
In 2006, Spider-Man: Battle for New York was released for the Nintendo DS and Game Boy Advance. Set in the Ultimate Marvel universe prior to the events of the Ultimate Spider-Man game, it features both Spider-Man and the Green Goblin as playable characters, with Spider-Man voiced by James Arnold Taylor.

Stern Pinball game
Stern Pinball has developed a Spider-Man pinball machine that encompasses all three Spider-Man theatrical releases, released in June 2007. This machine is designed by Steve Ritchie and programmed by Lyman Sheats.

Spider-Man: Web of Shadows
Spider-Man appears as the lead in Spider-Man: Web of Shadows, voiced by Mike Vaughn. In the game's storyline, Venom has successfully invaded Manhattan with a symbiote army, forcing Spider-Man to join forces with heroes and villains alike to defeat him. The game also features the black suit, which Spider-Man can take on and off at any time during gameplay, and morality choices that influence certain aspects of the story, including the ending of the game. Released on October 21, 2008, Web of Shadows has received positive reviews with critics praising the idea of an original story, but citing poor polish and execution. Three separate versions of the game were released: a 3D open world action game for PS3, Xbox 360, Wii and Microsoft Windows, a 2.5D side-scrolling beat 'em up for the PlayStation Portable and PlayStation 2 (called Amazing Allies Edition), and a 2.5D side-scrolling brawler/platformer for the Nintendo DS.

Marvel: Ultimate Alliance 2 
Spider-Man returns as a playable character in Marvel: Ultimate Alliance 2, voiced by Benjamin Diskin. In this game, he has the only alternate costume, which is entitled the Iron Spider. The game's plot is mainly based on the Secret War and Civil War story arcs from Marvel comics, with several new elements added. Early on in the story, players can choose to be either as a Pro- or Anti-Superhuman Registration Act, and both factions have their own branching narratives, which often cross over with each other. As such, Spider-Man can end up on either side of the conflict depending on the player's choices, which is reflective of the actual events of Civil War, where Spider-Man was originally supportive of the Act, but eventually defected to the Anti-Registration side in the process.

Marvel Super Hero Squad
Spider-Man appears as one of the playable heroes in the Marvel Super Hero Squad with Josh Keaton reprising the role. Regular, symbiote, and 2099 versions of Spider-Man are playable.

Spider-Man is also in Marvel Super Hero Squad: The Infinity Gauntlet, voiced again by Josh Keaton, and he appears in Marvel Super Hero Squad Online, voiced by Mikey Kelley.

2010s

Spider-Man: Shattered Dimensions (2010)

Four different versions of Spider-Man are playable in Spider-Man: Shattered Dimensions, a game from Activision and Beenox. Four different incarnations of Spider-Man, from the Amazing, Noir, 2099, and Ultimate universes, are featured in the game, voiced by veteran Spider-Man voice actors Neil Patrick Harris, Christopher Daniel Barnes, Dan Gilvezan, and Josh Keaton, respectively. It was released on September 7, 2010, to generally positive reviews. In the game's storyline, the Marvel multiverse is endangered after a powerful artifact called the Tablet of Order and Chaos is shattered by Spider-Man during a fight with Mysterio, forcing the four different versions of the web-slinger to retrieve the tablet fragments from the hands of various villains within their respective dimensions and save their realities. The game is notable for inspiring the 2014 comic book storyline, Spider-Verse.

LittleBigPlanet
Spider-Man is available as downloadable content for the game LittleBigPlanet, as part of "Marvel Costume Kit 2".

Marvel vs. Capcom 3: Fate of Two Worlds
Spider-Man appeared as a playable character in the crossover fighting game Marvel vs. Capcom 3: Fate of Two Worlds. The character is once again voiced by Josh Keaton. He has the first four alternate color schemes: the classic red and blue costume, the black costume, the "Iron Spider", and the black and green suit from the recent "Big Time" storyline.

Ultimate Marvel vs. Capcom 3
Spider-Man reprises his role as a playable character in Ultimate Marvel vs. Capcom 3, which is eventually an enhanced version of Marvel vs. Capcom 3: Fate of Two Worlds. He is once again voiced by Josh Keaton. His black and green outfit was now replaced with the black and red outfit from "Big Time" as well as the black and yellow Spider Armor suit. He additionally gains his white and black Future Foundation outfit, and his DLC costume is Ben Reilly's Scarlet Spider outfit.

Spider-Man: Edge of Time
Spider-Man: Edge of Time is a 2011 adventure game that was developed by Beenox and Activision. It is a sequel to Spider-Man: Shattered Dimensions, although it features only the Amazing Spider-Man, voiced by Josh Keaton, and Spider-Man 2099, voiced by Christopher Daniel Barnes, who combat a new threat across space and time as they attempt to save both of their realities.

The Amazing Spider-Man
The Amazing Spider-Man is a game based on the movie of same name that was released in 2012. It serves as an epilogue to the film, set several months later, and sees Spider-Man reluctantly joining forces with Curt Connors to find a cure for a deadly virus that originated from failed cross-species experiments created by Oscorp using Connor's research. The game was developed by Beenox and Activision, the same developers of Spider-Man: Shattered Dimensions and Spider-Man: Edge of Time. Sam Riegel voices Spider-Man, save for the iOS version, where he is voiced by Yuri Lowenthal.

Marvel: Avengers Alliance
Spider-Man is a playable character in the Facebook game, Marvel: Avengers Alliance.

Marvel: Avengers Alliance Tactics
Spider-Man is a playable character in the Facebook game, Marvel: Avengers Alliance Tactics.

Marvel Avengers: Battle for Earth
Spider-Man appears as a playable character in the 2012 fighting game Marvel Avengers: Battle for Earth.

Marvel Heroes
Spider-Man is a playable character in the MMORPG Marvel Heroes, voiced by Drake Bell reprising the role while Spider-Man wears his Modern costume, Christopher Daniel Barnes reprises his voice role while Spider-Man wears his Symbiote costume.

LEGO Marvel's Avengers
Spider-Man appeared as a free DLC character in Lego Marvel's Avengers in both classic, his civilian identity and his separate Marvel Cinematic Universe's first appearance costume from Captain America: Civil War, bundled with Iron Spider, Ben Reilly version of Scarlet Spider, Ultimate Miles Morales and Ultimate version Spider-Woman.

LEGO Marvel Super Heroes
Spider-Man is a playable character in Lego Marvel Super Heroes, voiced again by James Arnold Taylor. He serves as one of the main story characters in the game alongside the Avengers (consisting of Iron Man, Captain America, Hulk, Thor, Black Widow, Hawkeye), the X-Men (consisting of Angel, Beast, Cyclops, Iceman, Jean Grey, Wolverine, Storm, Colossus, Gambit, Charles Xavier, and Emma Frost), and the Fantastic Four.

The Amazing Spider-Man 2
The Amazing Spider-Man 2 is a game loosely based on the movie of same name, developed by Beenox and was released in April 2014. Riegel reprises his role as Spider-Man, while Yuri Lowenthal reprises the role in the iOS version. This was the last game published by Activision before the license expired, as well as the last major Spider-Man video game to be released for the Xbox and Nintendo platforms.

Marvel: Contest of Champions
Spider-Man is a playable character in Marvel: Contest of Champions. Spider-Man (Symbiote), Spider-Man (Stark Enhanced), Spider-Man (Stealth Suit), Miles Morales and Spider-Man 2099 also appear as separate playable characters.

Marvel Puzzle Quest
Spider-Man is one of the heroes in Marvel Puzzle Quest.

Spider-Man Unlimited
Spider-Man Unlimited, an endless runner mobile game developed by Gameloft, was released in September 2014 for iOS, Android, and Windows Phone. It features Spider-Man, along with his other alternative versions, as playable characters. Spider-Man is voiced by Yuri Lowenthal.

Disney Infinity: Marvel Super Heroes
Spider-Man is a playable character in the toys-to-life video game Disney Infinity: Marvel Super Heroes. with Drake Bell reprising his voice role.

Marvel Mighty Heroes
Spider-Man was a playable character in Marvel Mighty Heroes, until the game was shut down only a year after its launch.

Marvel: Future Fight
Spider-Man is a playable character in the mobile game Marvel: Future Fight.

Marvel: Avengers Alliance 2
Spider-Man is a playable character in the mobile game Marvel: Avengers Alliance 2.

Marvel Avengers Academy
Spider-Man is a playable character in the mobile game Marvel Avengers Academy.

Marvel vs. Capcom: Infinite
Spider-Man returns and appears as a playable character in Marvel vs. Capcom: Infinite with Robbie Daymond reprising his voice role from the 2017 Marvel's Spider-Man series. He was officially revealed at San Diego Comic-Con 2017, along with Frank West from the Dead Rising series, Mike Haggar from the Street Fighter series and the Nemesis from the Resident Evil series.

Marvel Strike Force
Spider-Man appears as a playable character in Marvel Strike Force. He is a City Brawler allied with the Web Warriors team. His default costume as Spider-Man is based on his classic outfit with influences from his costume in Spider-Man: Homecoming, while his alternate costume is based on the black and gold suit from Spider-Man: No Way Home. His Symbiote costume is a separate playable character, as are Miles Morales, Scarlet Spider, Ghost-Spider and Spider-Punk.

Lego Marvel Super Heroes 2
Spider-Man returns as a playable character in Lego Marvel Super Heroes 2. He teams with the other heroes to stop the evil Kang the Conqueror. He seems to be good friends with Kamala Khan, White Tiger and Star-Lord, and is seen flirting with Crystal. He primarily wears a costume based on the one worn by Tom Holland's character in Marvel Cinematic Universe (introduced in Captain America: Civil War). The homemade suit (shown in Spider-Man: Homecoming) also appears as an unlockable variant. He is voiced by the British voice actor Martin T. Sherman.

Marvel's Spider-Man

At E3 2016, Sony announced a new Spider-Man game developed by Insomniac Games for the PlayStation 4. Marvel's Spider-Man features a detailed open world environment and depicts an older and more experienced Spider-Man with an original story and no ties with any existing Marvel project. Spider-Man was again voiced by Yuri Lowenthal. The game was also remastered for PlayStation 5 and Microsoft Windows.

Marvel Battle Lines
Spider-Man appears in Marvel Battle Lines, voiced again by Robbie Daymond.

Marvel Ultimate Alliance 3: The Black Order
Spider-Man is featured as a playable character in the Nintendo reboot of the Marvel: Ultimate Alliance series - Marvel Ultimate Alliance 3: The Black Order - voiced again by Yuri Lowenthal. The game was officially announced at The Game Awards 2018, and released on July 19, 2019, for the Nintendo Switch.

Marvel Super War
Spider-Man is a playable character in the mobile game Marvel Super War.

2020s

Marvel's Spider-Man: Miles Morales
On June 11, 2020, Sony announced a new Spider-Man game titled Spider-Man: Miles Morales, which was released for the PlayStation 4 and PlayStation 5 in November 2020, and set to be released for Microsoft Windows in late 2022. The game is a follow-up to 2018's Marvel's Spider-Man game, and shifts focus towards Miles Morales as he learns to master his new powers and become his own Spider-Man. Miles Morales is voiced by Nadji Jeter, and Peter Parker appears in a supporting role, with Yuri Lowenthal reprising the role.

Marvel's Avengers
On August 3, 2020, Crystal Dynamics announced that Spider-Man will be added as a playable character in their Marvel's Avengers game via a free DLC, which released on November 30, 2021, exclusively for the PlayStation versions. The character is voiced by Sean Chiplock. This version of Peter Parker applied an internship at A.I.M. alongside Allan Chemicals’ heir, Liz Allan, following a tragedy of A-Day. During the internship, Peter and Liz discover A.I.M.’s shady operations, including the organization’s co-operations with some of Spider-Man’s rogues, such as Marx Raxton and Spencer Smythe. While Spider-Man joins the Avengers, Liz joins the Resistance. However, it is ultimately revealed that Raxton had been helping the heroes to uncover A.I.M.'s shady operations and expose them to the public. In the end, Raxton betrays Spencer and A.I.M., while receiving a reduced sentence for exposing their illegal activities.

Marvel Future Revolution
Spider-Man is a playable character in Marvel Future Revolution, voiced again by Yuri Lowenthal. Many other versions of Peter Parker / Spider-Man from alternate realities also appear as NPCs, including one from the technologically advanced New Stark City or one who eventually made a deal with Mephisto which caused him the soul of Mary Jane Watson.

Marvel's Midnight Suns 
Spider-Man features as a playable character in the tactical role-playing game Marvel's Midnight Suns developed by Firaxis and published by 2K Games. He will again be voiced by Yuri Lowenthal. Venom will also appear in both its regular form as a playable character, and a corrupted variant posing as a supporting villain serving under Lilith, voiced by Darin De Paul.

Marvel's Spider-Man 2
In September 2021, Insomniac Games revealed Spider-Man 2 at the PlayStation Showcase event as the sequel to Spider-Man and Miles Morales. Yuri Lowenthal and Nadji Jeter reprise their voice roles as Peter Parker / Spider-Man and Miles Morales, with Tony Todd voicing the character Venom.

Fortnite Battle Royale
In December 2021, Spider-Man was added as a purchasable playable outfit in Fortnite Battle Royale Chapter 3 Season 1 Battle Pass. Additionally, Spider-Man also got his own map location named "The Daily Bugle", based on the Marvel location of the same name, and got his own Mythic item called "Spider-Man's Web Slingers", which lets the player wear Spider-Man's gloves and shoot webs and swing in Spider-Man's likeness. The Spider-Man outfit also had two additional unlockable styles based on his Symbiote and Future Foundation suits. Later in December, during the Winterfest Christmas event, the Marvel Cinematic Universe versions of Spider-Man and MJ appeared as purchasable outfits in the Item Shop, character design by the then-forthcoming film Spider-Man: No Way Home.

In January 2022, the Green Goblin was added as part of the game.

See also
Marvel Games
Spider-Man in other media

References

External links

History of Spider-Man Games at GameSpot
UGO.com's Spider-Man Hub
Spider-Man pinball video
The Many Looks of Spider-Man (Videogames)

Activision Blizzard franchises
Spider-Man in other media
 
Spider-Man lists
 
Video game franchises
Lists of video games by franchise